McLoughlin v O'Brian [1983] 1 AC 410 is an English tort law case, decided by the House of Lords, dealing with the possibility of recovering for psychiatric harm suffered as a result of an accident in which one's family was involved.

Facts 
On 19 October 1973, a friend came to the plaintiff's house to tell her of a serious accident, involving her husband and three children, two hours after it had occurred. He drove her to the hospital where she was told one child was dead, and saw her husband and two other children seriously injured, covered in oil and mud. She suffered serious nervous shock as a result and sued the defendant who was responsible for the accident.

Earlier decisions in English courts had allowed victims to recover damages for psychiatric injury sustained as a result of witnessing the imperilment of a loved one, but only where the claimant was actually present at the scene. This case was unique at the time because the claimant suffered injuries away from the scene of the accident and hours after the accident occurred.

This case is frequently examined by law students and students of legal philosophy. Legal scholar Ronald Dworkin used the case as subject matter in a hypothetical case examined by a fictional, ideal judge named Hercules in his book Law's Empire.

Trial judgment
The trial judge held that the defendants owed duty of care to the claimant as she saw her husband and children covered in oil and blood as a result of the accident. She suffered psychiatric injury, including clinical depression and personality changes, after witnessing her family's situation in the hospital. The trial ruled for McLoughlin.

Court of Appeal judgment
The Court of Appeal rejected McLoughlin's appeal on grounds of public policy. The Court held the injury was foreseeable, and a duty of care was owed to McLoughlin. However, they did not allow McLoughlin to recover damages. Stephenson L.J. held that the consequence of breach should be limited as a matter of policy. Griffiths L.J. held that the defendants had a limited duty of care (e.g. only towards persons near the road who were directly affected), and that foreseeable consequences did not automatically impose a duty of care.

The Court also held that only legislature should extend the scope of liability.

House of Lords judgment
The House of Lords found in favour of McLoughlin, that the nervous shock suffered by McLoughlin was reasonably foreseeable and that policy considerations should not inhibit a decision in her favour.

Lord Wilberforce delivered the leading speech, and laid out the test for recovery of damages for personal injury resulting from nervous shock. First, a close familial relationship must exist between claimant and victim (the Court disqualified an ordinary bystander). Second, the claimant must be in close proximity to the accident "in both time and place"; this includes witnesses of the immediate aftermath of the accident. Third, and last, the shock suffered by the claimant must "come through sight or hearing of the event, or of its immediate aftermath".  Lords Wilberforce and Scarman both noted the influence of the leading American case on this issue, Dillon v. Legg (1968).

See also
 English tort law
 Nervous shock (English Law)

References

English tort case law
House of Lords cases
English psychiatric injury case law
Lord Wilberforce cases
1982 in British law
1982 in case law